The winners of the 2015 IndieWire Critics Poll were announced on December 14, 2015.

Winners and nominees

References

Indiewire Critics' Poll
Indiewire Critics' Poll